The 2013–14 Israeli Noar Premier League was the 20th season since its introduction in 1994 as the top-tier football in Israel for teenagers between the ages 18–20, and the 3rd under the name Noar Premier League.

Maccabi Haifa won the title, whilst Bnei Yehuda and Hapoel Ramat HaSharon were relegated.

Final table

References

External links
 2013-2014 Noar Premier League IFA 
Noar Premier League 13-14 One.co.il 

Israeli Noar Premier League seasons
Youth